Malavika Harita is an Indian executive who is the former CEO of advertising and communications company Saatchi & Saatchi Focus that has now been rechristened to Publicis Health & Publicis Business. She is also the president of Ad club of Bangalore.

Early life and education
Malavika completed her masters from Indian Institute of Management Bangalore in 1982.

Career
Malavika started her professional career at HMT Watches in an advertising and sales promotion function and joined Saatchi in 1993 after a stint at Mudra Communications. She also teaches advertising and brand management at various postgraduate institutes of management and communication in India.

Awards and honours
Malavika was the first woman to be awarded the Distinguished Alumni Award by IIM Bangalore. She was one of the first Gurukul Chevening Scholars, selected by the British Government for a special program under Lord Meghnad Desai at London School of Economics on Globalization.

References

Indian Institute of Management Bangalore alumni
Indian chief executives
Living people
Indian women chief executives
Businesspeople from Bangalore
Businesswomen from Karnataka
Year of birth missing (living people)